The Men's individual pursuit at the 2012 UCI Track Cycling World Championships was held on April 7. Twenty-two athletes participated in the contest. After the qualification, the two fastest riders advanced to the final and the 3rd- and 4th-fastest riders raced for the bronze medal.

Medalists

Results

Qualifying
The Qualifying was held at 13:00.

Finals
The finals were held at 20:35.

Small Final

Final

References

2012 UCI Track Cycling World Championships
UCI Track Cycling World Championships – Men's individual pursuit